Nitzschia is a common pennate marine diatom. In the scientific literature, this genus, named after Christian Ludwig Nitzsch, is sometimes termed Nitzchia, and it has many species described, which all have a similar morphology.

Occurrence
Nitzschia is found mostly in colder waters, and is associated with both Arctic and Antarctic polar sea ice, where it is often found to be the dominant diatom. Nitzschia includes several species of diatoms known to produce the neurotoxin known as domoic acid, a toxin responsible for the human illness called amnesic shellfish poisoning. The species N. frigida is found to grow exponentially even at temperatures between −4 and −6 °C. Some Nitzschia species are also extremophiles by dent of tolerance to high salinity; for example, some halophilic species of Nitzschia are found in the Makgadikgadi Pans in Botswana.

Species

Nitzschia acicularis
Nitzschia amphibia
Nitzschia angustata
Nitzschia brevissima
Nitzschia clausii
Nitzschia denticula
Nitzschia disputata
Nitzschia dissipata
Nitzschia filiformis
Nitzschia fonticula
Nitzschia frigida
Nitzschia gracilis
Nitzschia frigida
Nitzschia heuflerania
Nitzschia frigida
Nitzschia lacuum
Nitzschia palea
Nitzschia perminuta
Nitzschia pusill
Nitzschia recta
Nitzschia sigma
Nitzschia sigmoidea
Nitzschia sinuata
Nitzschia tubicola

For more information: http://www.algaebase.org/search/genus/detail/?genus_id=43680

References

External links
 

Bacillariales
Taxa named by Arthur Hill Hassall
Diatom genera